Lilly Biological Laboratories, also known as Eli Lilly and Company and Greenfield Laboratories, is a historic laboratory complex located at Greenfield, Hancock County, Indiana.  It was designed by Robert Frost Daggett and built in 1913-1914 for the Eli Lilly and Company.  The complex consists of three buildings: the Tower Building flanked by two adjacent two-story buildings connected to the main building by pergolas.  The buildings are in the Spanish Colonial Revival style with red tile roofs and arched openings.  The Tower Building features a prominent 80-foot tall tower with five levels topped by a pyramidal red tile roof.

It was listed on the National Register of Historic Places in 1977.

References

Industrial buildings and structures on the National Register of Historic Places in Indiana
Mission Revival architecture in Indiana
Industrial buildings completed in 1914
Buildings and structures in Hancock County, Indiana
National Register of Historic Places in Hancock County, Indiana